SABC 1 is a South African public television network operated by the South African Broadcasting Corporation (SABC) which carries programming in English and Nguni.

It was created in 1996, after the SABC restructured its television channels. SABC 1 carried much of its programming over from the defunct CCV (Contemporary Community Values) network, which was itself made up of the former TV2, TV3 and TV4 timeshared channels created in the 1980s. SABC 1 generates the widest audience in South Africa due to its programming diversity, airing SABC's longest-running soap-opera, Generations, Uzalo and Skeem Saam.

As of June 2018, the channel started broadcasting in high definition.

History
On 1 January 1982, two television channels were introduced: TV2, broadcasting in Zulu and Xhosa; and TV3, broadcasting in Sotho and Tswana, both targeted at a Black urban audience and airing on a timeshared radio frequency. The main network, now called TV1, divided its programming equally between English and Afrikaans programs, as before. In 1985, a new service called TV4 was introduced, carrying sports and entertainment programming, using the same radio frequency used by both TV2 and TV3, which stopped broadcasting at 9:30 pm.

In 1992, TV2, TV3 and TV4 were merged into a unified network called CCV (Contemporary Community Values) on the same channel frequency. A third network was introduced known as TSS, or TopSport Surplus, with TopSport being the brand name for SABC's sport coverage. However, in 1994, it was replaced by NNTV (National Network TV), a cultural non-commercial network. 
In 1996, the SABC reorganised its three television networks with the aim of making them more representative of the country's diverse ethnolinguistic groups. These were rebranded as SABC 1, SABC 2 and SABC 3, respectively.

Programming 
SABC 1 is heavily focused on local entertainment that is aimed towards the youth.

Soapies, dramas and telenovelas 
The channel has had the title of 'Mzansi's Storyteller' with popular local dramas, and popular soapies Generations: The Legacy, Uzalo and Skeem Saam. Other famed dramas from past years are Yizo Yizo, Zone 14, Intersexions, The Shakespeare in Mzansi Series, etc. However, over recent years, the title has been taken by Mzansi Magic.

Series 
The channel has a number of comedy, game shows and reality series such as Nyan'Nyan, Now or Never, It Takes a Village, Plate it up, The next big thing, Ses' Top La, Friends Like These, The Remix, Lip Sync Battle. Initially, it would have rights to broadcast local versions of international franchises like The X Factor, but due to financial constraints, the channel currently focuses on local reality competitions.

Music 
The channel airs some of the latest local urban music and playlists on shows like Live Amp and Koze Kuse, while also focusing on traditional indigenous music on shows like Roots, as well as choral music on one of their longest-running show Imizwilili.

Talk and magazine 
SABC 1 airs local informative magazine shows, from its longest-running magazine show Selimathunzi, to more recent and fresh show like Throwback Thursday and weekend breakfast shows like Mzansi Insider among others. In addition, SABC 1 hosts interactive talk shows such as Daily Thetha and The Chatroom.

Religion 
On a daily basis the channel showcases short religious shows that cater for African Traditional Religion, Christianity, Judaism and Islam. On weekends it boasts of religious music shows such as Gospel Avenue and Imvelo.

News and current affairs 
The channel has two bulletins, one for the SiSwati/Ndebele speakers, and one for IsiZulu/IsiXhosa speakers. In addition, it includes current affairs programs like Cutting Edge, Expressions and Yilungelo Lakho.

Sports 
SABC1 airs Premier Soccer League matches during the week and also have rights to other soccer events like Africa Cup of Nations, FIFA World Cup and other international friendlies. However, in August 2019, the channel could not afford broadcast rights to the PSL season, resulting in a blackout of sport on both TV and Radio platforms, thus not broadcasting matches for a certain period. This angered soccer fans who did not have access to SuperSport on DStv, since MultiChoice held the sporting rights. Sports Minister Nathi Mthethwa and Communications Minister Stella Ndabeni-Abrahams announced that after meeting with the public broadcaster's board and MultiChoice a resolution had been reached, and soccer matches resumed as normal.

Movies 
The network airs classic action, horror, drama, comedy, sci-fi, adventure, thriller, romance, and fantasy movies on certain weekends. SABC 1 also broadcasts Kicking Kung Fu movies on Fridays.

Children and education

SABC1 features some foreign children's programming, mostly from Disney Junior. In addition, it has the longest-running local kids show, YoTV, which broadcasts five times every weekday and once every weekend, and also has shows under its SABC Education banner that cater for all ages such as high school revision show Geleza Nathi and career shows Ispani and Teenagers on A Mission.

See also 
 List of South African media

References

External links

Television stations in South Africa
English-language television stations in South Africa
Television channels and stations established in 1996